Lake Quatre Lieues (Four-League Lake) is a lake in the province of Quebec, Canada. It is set in a wilderness area and may be used for relaxation, fishing or hunting.

Name

Location

Lake Quatre Lieues is in the unorganized territory of Lac-Walker  in the Sept-Rivières Regional County Municipality of the Côte-Nord administrative region of Quebec.
It is in the extreme south of the proposed Lake Walker National Park.
The MacDonald River flows through the northern end of Lake Quatre Lieues and continues east to join the Aux Rochers River to the south of Lake Walker.

The surrounding terraces are formed of sandy materials of deltaic origin.
These deposits were laid down during glacial decay in the Holocene.

The Cartier Railway owned by ArcelorMittal runs along the northeast shore of the lake before turning west along the MacDonald River valley.
The railway links the Mont Wright iron mine near Fermont to Port-Cartier.

Environment

NASA images indicate that the lake is in a region mostly covered in coniferous forests.
The district is in the boreal climate zone under the Köppen climate classification.
A map of the Ecological regions of Quebec places the lake in the 6J-T ecological subregion, part of the eastern spruce/moss domain of the boreal zone.

Visiting

The lake is a magnificent place for relaxation, fishing, hunting and boating.
The Port-Cartier–Sept-Îles Wildlife Reserve offers chalet rentals for hunting and fishing in the Quatre-lieues area.
In 2013 fishing for atlantic salmon was prohibited.
Angling or fly fishing for other species was allowed from 11 May 2012 to 3 September 2012.

Notes

Sources

Lakes of Côte-Nord